Vavvaneri is a small village near Kadambarayanpatti in Illupur Taluk, Annavasal Revenue Block in Pudukottai District. The PMGSY Code is TN13010345. The Habitation NIC code is 124311413. It has a population of around 280 as per Census 2001.

Temples in Vavvaneri

Ayyanar Temple 

The Ayyanar Temple in Vavvaneri is located on the banks of a small storm drain. The main idol is Ayyanar – sometimes referred to as Aadhanamalavi Ayyanar.

PidariAmman Temple 
The PidariAmman Temple in Vavvaneri is located nearer to the hamlet. The main idol is PidariAmman with a small MariAmman idol placed in the same chamber.

KaruppuSwamy Temple 
The KaruppuSwamy Temple is located behind the Ayyanar Temple, almost submerged in a small pond. The pond is dry for most part of the year, and is filled with water during the NE Monsoon Season.

Villages in Pudukkottai district